The Southeastern Legal Foundation  is a conservative non-profit constitutional public interest law firm and policy center in the United States. It was founded in 1976 and has its headquarters in Roswell, Georgia.

Organization
The Southeastern Legal Foundation represents individuals, businesses, and organizations in courts of law to defend the ideals of: limited government, individual freedoms, and government deregulation. In addition to the specific legal services offered, the SLF provides pro bono legal representation for constitutional matters.

Cases
As of 2010, The Southeastern Legal Foundation has filed a petition challenging the United States Environmental Protection Agency's December 7, 2009 findings which claim primarily that the "atmosphere threatens the public health and welfare of current and future generations", but also it hold humans as the responsible cause.

References

External links
 Southeastern Legal Foundation - Official

Civil liberties advocacy groups in the United States
Legal advocacy organizations in the United States
Political organizations based in the United States
Conservative organizations in the United States